King of Fools, released in 2004, is an EP by German power metal band Edguy. In addition to the title track, which appears on the album Hellfire Club, the EP includes four non-album tracks.

Track listing
 "King of Fools" (Edit Version) - 3:35
 "New Age Messiah" - 6:00
 "The Savage Union" - 4:15
 "Holy Water" - 4:17
 "Life and Times of a Bonus Track" - 3:23

Personnel
Tobias Sammet - Lead vocals
Tobias 'Eggi' Exxel - Bass Guitar
Jens Ludwig - Lead Guitar
Dirk Sauer - Rhythm  Guitar
Felix Bohnke - Drums

References

2004 EPs
Edguy EPs
Nuclear Blast EPs